Once Niñas y Niños (Eleven Kids) is a Mexican children's television network owned by the Instituto Politécnico Nacional. It is a companion to the Canal Once public television network. Once Niñas y Niños is broadcast as a subchannel on the IPN's Canal Once transmitters and is a required channel for carriage on all pay television systems in Mexico; it also airs a programming block of children's programs on the main Canal Once channel.

History
Canal Once launched Once Niños as its first digital subchannel on August 24, 2015. The channel would serve as an extension of the main channel's original children's programming for children between the ages of four and twelve; overnight, between midnight and 6am, it would not air programming, but instead an image inviting kids to go to sleep.

The name was modified from Once Niños to Once Niñas y Niños on January 15, 2020, as part of an initiative to promote gender parity; the name in Spanish had previously read Eleven Boys.

Coverage

Once Niñas y Niños is available on the entire IPN-owned transmitter network, though not from SPR transmitters. It is also available as a subchannel of XHZHZ-TDT, the state-owned television station in the state of Zacatecas.

References

Television networks in Mexico
Public television in Mexico
Instituto Politécnico Nacional
Spanish-language television stations in Mexico
2015 establishments in Mexico
Children's television networks